G-protein coupled receptor 39 is a protein that in humans is encoded by the GPR39 gene.

References

Further reading

G protein-coupled receptors